
R7 or R-7 may refer to:

Military
 R-7 (missile), the world's first intercontinental ballistic missile, created by the Soviet Union
 R-7 (rocket family), a family of expendable space launch vehicles, created by the Soviet Union
 , a 1985 Invincible class British Royal Navy light aircraft carrier
 USS R-7 (SS-84), a 1919 R-class coastal and harbor defense submarine of the United States Navy

Transport
 R7 (Belgium), the Liège ring road
 R7 Chestnut Hill East Line, a SEPTA rail route in Philadelphia, USA
 R7 expressway (Czech Republic), an expressway in Czech Republic
 R7 expressway (Slovakia), a planned expressway in southern Slovakia
 R7/A (New York City Subway car), a model of rail rolling stock manufactured in 1937
 R7 (Rodalies de Catalunya), a rail line in Barcelona, Spain
 R7 Trenton, a SEPTA rail route in Philadelphia, USA
 Aserca Airlines, IATA designator R7, an airline based in Valencia, Venezuela
 Radial Road 7 or R-7, an arterial road of Manila, Philippines
 Renault 7, a sedan car
 Rising Auto R7, an electric crossover SUV
 Vashon Ranger R7, an American light-sport aircraft design
 Yamaha YZF-R7, a 1999 racing homologation motorcycle by Yamaha
 Yamaha YZF-R7 (2022 bike), a supersport motorcycle by Yamaha

Other uses
 R7.com, a Brazilian news portal
 R7 (drug), a TrkB agonist under investigation for the treatment of Alzheimer's disease
 R7: May cause fire, a risk phrase in chemistry
 R7 Quad, a model of driver (golf club)
 ATC code R07, Other respiratory system products, a subgroup of the Anatomical Therapeutic Chemical Classification System
 Leica R7, a 1992 film-SLR camera
 Radeon R7, a series of graphics processing units made by AMD
 School District of Webb City R-7, a school district in Jasper County, Missouri, USA
 Drosophila's R7 photoreceptor, the development of which is governed by Sevenless

See also
 7R (disambiguation)